"Last Parade" is the first single by Matthew Good from his fourth solo album, Vancouver. The single was first made available for streaming on August 14, 2009.

Charts

References

2009 singles
Matthew Good songs
Songs written by Matthew Good
2009 songs
Universal Records singles